Tawi-Tawi's at-large congressional district refers to the lone congressional district of the Philippines in the province of Tawi-Tawi. The province has been represented in the country's national legislatures since 1984. It first elected a representative provincewide at-large during the 1984 Philippine parliamentary election following the restoration of provincial and city district representation in the Batasang Pambansa where Tawi-Tawi had previously been included in the regionwide representation of Western Mindanao (Region IX) for the interim parliament. The province, created by the 1973 separation of the Tawi-Tawi island group from Sulu, was formerly represented as part of that province's at-large district in earlier legislatures. Since the 1987 restoration of Congress following the ratification of a new constitution, Tawi-Tawi has been entitled to one member in the House of Representatives. It is currently represented in the 18th Congress by Dimszar M. Sali of the National Unity Party (NUP).

Representation history

Election results

2019

2016

2013

2010

See also
Legislative districts of Tawi-Tawi

References

Congressional districts of the Philippines
Politics of Tawi-Tawi
1984 establishments in the Philippines
At-large congressional districts of the Philippines
Congressional districts of Bangsamoro
Constituencies established in 1984